Queen of Hip-Pop is the seventh studio album, by recording artist Namie Amuro, It was released on July 13, 2005 after four singles and was her most commercially successful effort in five years before Play was released, the album received positive reviews and was nominated the Album of the Year in Asia Association Music Prize Awards.

Background and development 
While planning the album, Amuro decided she wanted to create music that would have its most profound effect live. The result is an album that is her most uptempo containing 11 R&B and hip hop songs and only one pop ballad. The term "Hip-Pop" has been coined to the describe the music on the album because of her image as a pop music icon and her transition to R&B/Hip-Hop music.

Packaging 
The album art theme is that of the Pink Panther. Amuro happened to be a big fan of the Pink Panther cartoon character and wanted to include its image. A licensing deal was struck with MGM studios allowing Amuro to freely use the character in her album artwork and promotion. A special character "Namie Panther" based on Amuro herself was also created as a counterpart to the Pink Panther. Because of the Pink Panther deal, all of the material released for the album has been pink (Amuro had stated in an interview years before that she did not like pink). First pressing packaging of the album included Pink Panther stickers and a Pink Panther styled newspaper containing lyrics for the album.

Tie-ups and theme songs 
"Alarm", "Girl Talk", and "WoWa" were used in TV commercials for the LUCIDO-L hair products. Amuro appeared in the three ad campaigns.

"All For You" was the theme song of the popular Japanese drama "Kimi Ga Omoide Ni Naru Mae Ni"

"No" was later used to promote the "Space of Hip-Pop -namie amuro tour 2005-" DVD

In the Hindi film "Darling", in the song "Aa Khushi Se Khud Khushi Kar Le", not only it had the same sitar sample, the first few opening lines and chorus parts are from the song "WANT ME, WANT ME" as well. The sitar sample from the song was also featured in the background music to the cycle 8 premiere episode of America's Next Top Model.

Before the announcement of the album, the title track, "Queen of Hip-Pop" was used as a commercial jingle for Chevrolet Suzuki Cruze automobiles.

Singles 
Four singles were released before Queen of Hip-Hop. The first, "ALARM", released in early 2004, is her first (and to date, only) single to miss the top ten. Despite the low sales, "ALARM" became a popular hit in Japan and she performed the song at the 2004 MTV Video Awards Japan.
 
Four months later she released "ALL FOR YOU", her first ballad since "I WILL" in 2002. The single was a great success and became the first of three consecutive singles to sell over 100,000 copies. She performed the song at the MTV Buzz Asia Concert.

In October, the double A-side single "GIRL TALK / the SPEED STAR" was released. However, only "GIRL TALK" was included on the album. Both songs were major hits. Amuro performed "GIRL TALK" at the MTV Asia Aid Concert in February 2005.

The last single of the album, "WANT ME, WANT ME", was her first single of 2005. The song was performed at the 2005 Kobe Collection before its release. "WANT ME, WANT ME" is an up-tempo track similar to reggaeton music and it's her first song to feature sexually aggressive lyrics. The single was a smash hit and opened at #2 with her largest first week sales since "Say the word". Two months later she performed the song at the 2005 MTV Video Awards Japan.

Another track off the album, "WoWa" (pronounced "Ooh Wah") was released as a video and radio single but was not retailed.

Sales 
Upon release, the album charted at number one in Japan for two days ultimately debuting at number two for the week. It has sold over 475,600 copies and is the 27th best selling album of 2005. Queen of Hip-Pop debuted at #1 on the Taiwanese J-Pop chart and #2 on the Combo Chart.
In the second quarter of 2006, Avex reported that Queen of Hip-Pop sold 494,000 copies in Japan.

Album information 
After "No", there is a hidden track which has no official title but is known to fans as "No Pt.2" or "Yes". At 4:06, the listener begins to hear the subtle sounds of the hidden track beginning. The song is a slower version of "No" with new lyrics and vocals. It also features lyrics from her song "WoWa" with variations of "I'ma make ya mine" and "I'ma read ya mind." The version posted on sites such as Imeem clocks in at about 2:35.

Track listing

Credits and personnel
 Queen of Hip-Pop
 Produced by Nao'ymt
 All instruments performed by Nao'ymt
 Mixed by D.O.I.
 WANT ME, WANT ME
 Produced by SUGI-V
 Co-Produced by Michico
 Vocal Produced by Michico
 All instruments performed by SUGI-V
 Mixed by D.O.I.
 WoWa
 Produced by Nao'ymt
 All instruments performed by Nao'ymt
 Mixed by D.O.I.
 I Wanna Show You My Love
 Produced by T.Kura
 Vocal Produced by Michico
 All instruments performed by T.Kura
 Mixed by T.Kura
 GIRL TALK
 Produced by T.Kura
 Vocal Produced by Michico
 All instruments performed by T.Kura
 Mixed by T.Kura
 Free
 Produced by Nao'ymt
 All instruments performed by Nao'ymt
 Mixed by Yoshiaki Onishi
 My Darling
 Produced by T.Kura
 Vocal Produced by Michico
 Additional Vocals by L.L.BROTHERS
 All instruments performed by T.Kura
 Mixed by T.Kura
 Ups & Downs duet with Nao'ymt
 Produced by Nao'ymt
 All instruments performed by Nao'ymt
 Mixed by Yoshiaki Onishi
 I Love You
 Produced by C."Tricky" Stewart
 Japanese Lyrics by Shoko Fujibayashi
 All instruments performed by C."Tricky" Stewart
 Track Recorded by Brian"B-Luv"Thomas
 Mixed by Carlton Lynn
 ALL FOR YOU
 Arranged by Jun Abe & Ryoki Matsumoto
 Chorus arranged by Ryoki Matsumoto
 Programmed by Jun Abe
 Chorus: Ryoki Matsumoto
 Piano & Keyboard: Jun Abe
 Guitar: Kenji Suzuki
 Strings: Rush by Takashi Katou
 Mixed by Junya Endo
 ALARM
 All instruments performed by MONK
 Mixed by Yoshiaki Onishi
No
 Produced by Nao'ymt
 All instruments performed by Nao'ymt
 Mixed by D.O.I.

 Lead and Background Vocals directed by Nao'ymt(#1,8,12), Michico(#2,4,5,7), Daisuke Imai(#3,6,9), Kenji Sano(#11)
 Recorded by Toshihiro Wako, except #3 (by Yusuke Abe) and #10 (by Toshihiro Wako & Eiji Kameda)
 Mastered by Tom Coyne

Production 
 Producers - T.Kura, Michico, Nao'ymt, C. "Tricky" Stewart, SUGI-V
 Vocal Producers - Michico
 Vocal Direction - Daisuke Imai, Michico, Nao'ymt, Kenji Sano
 Chorus Arrangement - Ryoki Matsumoto
 Mixing - D.O.I, Junya Endo, T.Kura, Carlton Lynn, Yoshiaki Onishi
 Photography - Shoji Uchida
 Art Direction - Hidekazu Sato

Charts and sales
Oricon Sales Chart (Japan)

Singles - Oricon Sales Chart (Japan)

Total Single Sales:  371,880

Total Album and Single Sales:  827,308

RIAJ Certification 
As of January 2006 "Queen of Hip-Pop" has been certified double platinum for shipments of over 500,000 by the RIAJ.

References 

 

Namie Amuro albums
2005 albums
Avex Group albums